The 100 Books of the Century is a list of the one hundred most memorable books of the 20th century, according to a poll performed during the spring of 1999 by the French retailer Fnac and the Paris newspaper Le Monde.

Overview
Starting from a preliminary list of 200 titles created by bookshops and journalists, 17,000 French participants responded to the question, "Which books have remained in your memory?" (Quels livres sont restés dans votre mémoire?).

The list includes both classic novels and genre fiction (Tolkien, Agatha Christie, A. C. Doyle), as well as poetry, drama and nonfiction literature (Freud's essays and the diary of Anne Frank). There are also comic books on the list, one album from each of these five francophone or italian series: Asterix, Tintin,  Blake and Mortimer, Gaston and Corto Maltese. The large number of French novels of the list is due to the demographics of the surveyed group.

Likewise, comparable lists by English language sources—such as the two lists of Modern Library 100 Best Novels published in 1998, one by the Board of the Modern Library and the other by readers who responded—disproportionately favour British and American authors. Non-English language works were not eligible for the two Modern Library lists.

List

Note: Classified by the language of the book's first publication, which might not be the author's principal language.

See also
Bokklubben World Library (Norway)
List of Nobel laureates in Literature (Sweden) – including Camus, Steinbeck, Hemingway, Beckett, Sartre, Solzhenitsyn, Gide, García Márquez, Faulkner, Mauriac, Mann, Pirandello, Böll, Lagerlöf, Le Clézio, and Perse
List of recipients of the Grand Prize of the Académie française (France) – including de Saint-Exupéry, Cohen, Mauriac, Bernanos, and Tournier
List of recipients of the Prix Goncourt (France) – including Proust, Malraux, de Beauvoir, Tournier, Gracq, and Duras
List of recipients of the Prix Renaudot (France) – including Céline, Perec, Aragon, Le Clézio, and Beigbeder
List of recipients of the Prix mondial Cino Del Duca (France) – including Kundera, Borges, Kadare, and Styron
List of recipients of the Prix Médicis (France) – including Eco, Perec, and Kundera
List of recipients of the Pulitzer Prize for Fiction (US) – including Steinbeck, Hemingway, Faulkner, Mitchell, and Styron
List of recipients of the Neustadt Prize for Literature (US) – including García Márquez and Kadare
List of recipients of the European Literary Award (Austria) – including de Beauvoir, Eco, Ionesco, Kundera, Duras, and Rushdie
List of recipients of the Jerusalem Prize (Israel) – including de Beauvoir, Ionesco, Kundera, Borges, and Kadare
List of recipients of the Strega Prize (Italy) – including Eco, Buzzati, Moravia, and Levi
List of recipients of the Prince of Asturias Award (Spain) – including Kadare
List of recipients of the Cervantes Prize (Spain) – including Borges
Western canon
Great Books of the Western World
Modern Library 100 Best Novels (US) – all were first published in English
TIME's List of the 100 Best Novels (US) – all were first published in English
The Big Read (UK)

References

External links
''Newsweek'''s Top 100 Books
Books o' the Ages: A Millennial/Centennial/Decennial/Annual Reassessment, overview of Best of Century lists

Lists of books
20th-century books
Lists of novels
20th-century novels
French literature
Philosophy books
Top book lists